The 2022 Copa do Brasil Finals were the final two-legged tie that decided the 2022 Copa do Brasil, the 34th season of the Copa do Brasil, Brazil's national cup football tournament organised by the Brazilian Football Confederation.

The finals were contested in a two-legged home-and-away format between Corinthians, from São Paulo, and Flamengo, from Rio de Janeiro. Corinthians and Flamengo reached the Copa do Brasil finals for the seventh and eighth time, respectively.

The finals took place on 12 and 19 October 2022. A draw by CBF was held on 20 September 2022 to determine the home-and-away teams for each leg. The first leg was hosted by Corinthians at Neo Química Arena in São Paulo, while the second leg was hosted by Flamengo at Maracanã in Rio de Janeiro.

Tied 1–1 on aggregate, Flamengo defeated Corinthians 6–5 on penalties to win their fourth title. As champions, Flamengo qualified for the 2023 Copa Libertadores group stage and 2023 Supercopa do Brasil.

Teams

Road to the final

Note: In all scores below, the score of the home team is given first.

Format
In the finals, the teams played a single-elimination tournament with the following rules:
The finals were played on a home-and-away two-legged basis. The home-and-away teams for both legs were determined by a draw held on 20 October 2022 at the CBF headquarters in Rio de Janeiro, Brazil.
If tied on aggregate, the away goals rule and extra time would not be used and the penalty shoot-out would be used to determine the winners. (Regulations Article 20).

Matches
Bruno Henrique and Rodrigo Caio (Flamengo) were ruled out of the finals due to injuries. João Gomes (Flamengo), booked in the first leg, was suspended and did not play the second leg.

First leg

Second leg

See also
2022 Campeonato Brasileiro Série A

References

2022
Finals
Copa do Brasil Finals
Sport Club Corinthians Paulista matches
CR Flamengo matches
Association football penalty shoot-outs